Moorad Choudhry was formerly Head of Business Treasury, Global Banking and Markets at Royal Bank of Scotland.

Education
Choudhry attended Claremont Fan Court School. He graduated from the University of Westminster (known as Polytechnic of Central London at the time) with a First class degree in Economics. He graduated from the University of Reading with an MA. In 1998, he completed an MBA at Henley Management College. In 2008, he completed a PhD in Financial economics at Birkbeck, University of London.

Choudhry is Visiting Professor at the Department of Economics, London Metropolitan University, a Visiting Research Fellow at the ICMA Centre, University of Reading, a Senior Fellow at the Centre for Mathematical Trading and Finance, Cass Business School, a Fellow of the Securities and Investment Institute and a Fellow of the Institute of Sales and Marketing Management.

Career
Choudhry was formerly Head of Business Treasury, Global Banking and Markets at Royal Bank of Scotland plc. Before joining RBS, He was Head of Treasury at Europe Arab Bank, a subsidiary of Arab Bank. He joined there from KBC Financial Products in London, the derivatives and convertible bond trading arm of KBC Bank N.V., Brussels. Prior to that he was a vice-president in Structured Finance Services sales and marketing at JPMorgan Chase Bank, a sterling proprietary trader in the Treasury division at Hambros Bank Limited, and a Gilt-Edged Market Maker and money markets trader at ABN Amro Hoare Govett Limited. He began his City career at the London Stock Exchange in 1989.

Also, he is on the advisory board of Official Monetary and Financial Institutions Forum (OMFIF) where he is regularly involved in meetings regarding the financial and monetary system.

Awards and nominations
In January 2015, Choudhry was nominated for the Arts and Culture Awareness award at the British Muslim Awards.

Professional Affiliations
 Fellow, Securities & Investment Institute
 Fellow, Global Association of Risk Professionals
 Fellow, Institute of Sales and Marketing Management
 Member, ifs School of Finance

Boards
 Editorial Board, Journal of Structured Finance
 Editorial Advisory Board, Qualitative Research in Financial Markets
 Editorial Board, Securities and Investment Review

Selected bibliography
Choudhry is author of numerous books, some of which have been translated into Chinese and Japanese: 
 The Bond and Money Markets: Strategy, Trading, Analysis (Butterworth-Heinemann, 2001)
 The REPO Handbook (Butterworth-Heinemann, 2002)
 (with Frank J Fabozzi; Steven V Mann;The Global Money Markets  Hoboken, N.J. : J. Wiley, 2002 In 784 WorldCat libraries
 (with Frank J Fabozzi;) The Handbook of European Fixed Income Securities (with Frank Fabozzi) (John Wiley, 2004)
 Structured Credit Products: Credit Derivatives and Synthetic Securitisation (John Wiley, 2004), 2nd ed.  3rd ed. 2011
An Introduction to Credit Derivatives, 2004, Butterworth- Heinemann, 
Review, The RMA Journal – 1 November 2004
 Analysing and Interpreting the Yield Curve (Wiley Asia, 2004)
 The Money Markets Handbook (Wiley Asia, 2004)
 Fixed-income securities and derivatives handbook: Analysis and valuation. Princeton, NJ: Bloomberg Press. 2005    In 623 WorldCat libraries  
 The Credit Default Swap Basis (Bloomberg Press, 2006)
 Bank Asset and Liability Management (Wiley Asia, 2007)
 Capital Market Instruments, 3rd edition (Palgrave MacMillan, 2010)
 (with Suleman Baig) The Mechanics of Securitization: A Practical Guide to Structuring and Closing Asset-Backed Security Transactions. Hoboken, N.J.: Wiley, 2013.

See also
British Bangladeshi
Business of British Bangladeshis
List of British Bangladeshis

References

External links

Living people
Year of birth missing (living people)
British Muslims
British people of Bangladeshi descent
British businesspeople
People from Surrey
People educated at Claremont Fan Court School
Alumni of the University of Westminster
Alumni of the University of Reading
Alumni of Birkbeck, University of London
Academics of Bayes Business School